Strobe,  usually refers to a strobe light, in which light is emitted at regular intervals, usually as short flashes in rapid succession.

Strobe or STROBE may also refer to:

 Strobe Effect, the apparently slowed down or reversal of periodic processes that are only observed at certain, regularly successive time intervals, for example by means of light flashes ( stroboscopes ) or a rotating disk with windows that only temporarily reveal the view.
 Flash (photography),  in professional studio equipment, flashes may be large, standalone units, known as studio strobes.

 Strobe (comics), a character in the Marvel comics universe
 The Strobe, former name of Studio 54 Radio
 Strengthening the reporting of observational studies in epidemiology (STROBE)
 "Strobe" (instrumental), a 2009 instrumental by deadmau5 from For Lack of a Better Name
 Strobe Media Playback (SMP), a media player by Adobe Systems based on their Open Source Media Framework (OSMF)
 Strobe Talbott (born 1946), American foreign policy analyst and former US Deputy Secretary of State
 Strobe tuner, used to tune musical instruments and audio devices
 strobe.c, a TCP half-open portscanner written by Julian Assange in 1995

See also
 Strob fungicide